Kith or KITH may refer to:

Art and entertainment
 Kith (Poul Anderson), a spacefaring civilization featured in a number of stories by American sci-fi author Poul Anderson
 Kith, the various "species" of faerie creatures in the "World of Darkness" role playing game, Changeling: The Dreaming
 KITH (FM), a radio station of Hawaii, United States
 Kidz in the Hall, an American hip hop duo from Chicago, Illinois
 The Kids in the Hall, Canadian sketch comedy group
 KITH, clothing brand

Other uses 
 KITH (FM), a radio station of Hawaii, United States
 KITH NYC, a New York City clothing and footwear store operated by Ronnie Fieg 
 KITH, the ICAO code for Ithaca Tompkins International Airport
Friendship, friends and acquaintances, as in "kith and kin"

See also
 Kith and Kin Pro
 Keith (disambiguation)